Patrick Maxwell may refer to:

 G. Patrick Maxwell, American plastic surgeon
 Paddy Maxwell (1909–1991), Irish solicitor and politician
 Patrick Maxwell (cricketer), played for Dublin University
 Patrick Maxwell (British physician), Regius Professor of Physic at the University of Cambridge